Lanslebourg-Mont-Cenis is a former commune in the Savoie department in the Auvergne-Rhône-Alpes region in south-eastern France. On 1 January 2017, it was merged into the new commune Val-Cenis.

Points of interest
Jardin botanique de Mont Cenis
Mont Cenis
Val Cenis Vanoise ski resort

See also
Communes of the Savoie department

References

External links

 Official site 

Former communes of Savoie
France–Italy border crossings